Culebra Air Services, established in 1998 as Air Culebra, is a small Puerto Rican airline company that operates out of the island of Culebra, in Puerto Rico, and the Luis Muñoz Marín International Airport, in San Juan. As of 2015, the airline is owned by pilot, captain Matthew Mulvey.

Destinations
Using small propeller engine airplanes, the airline flies charter flights all around the Caribbean, and to The Bahamas as well. From The Bahamas, it flies to the eastern part of the United States. Culebra Air Services also performs regularly scheduled passenger seat's airline duties with flights between Culebra, San Juan, Vieques and, formerly, to Fajardo, all in Puerto Rico.

Fleet
As of 2020, the airline owned 3 PA23 Piper Aztec Twin aircraft.

References

External links

1998 establishments in Puerto Rico
Airlines of Puerto Rico
Airlines established in 1998
Culebra, Puerto Rico
Puerto Rican brands